The term  or sanjin, as understood in Japanese folklore, has come to be applied to a group, some scholars claim, of ancient, marginalized people, dating back to some unknown date during the Jōmon period of the history of Japan.

The term itself has been translated as "Mountain People", or as Dickins interprets the word as "Woodsman",  but there is more to it than that. It is from texts recorded by historian Kunio Yanagita that introduced, through their legends and  tales, of the concept of being spirited away into Japanese popular culture.

Tono Monogatari
According to Yanagita, the Yamabito were "descendants of a real, separate aboriginal race of people who were long ago forced into the mountains by the Japanese who then populated the plains" during the Jōmon period.

Yanagita wrote down these folktales in the book Tono Monogatari, though as author Sadler notes:

Kamikakushi
One of the concepts Yanagita presents in Tono Monogatari is that of, literally, being spirited away, or 
kamikakushi. As author Sadler relates:

The Yamabito debate
The stories found within Tono Monogatari are not without their detractors. Minakata Kumagusu was highly critical of  Yangita's research, "heaping severe criticism and ridicule on belief that ... the Yamabito ever existed." According to records, between 1915–1916, the two scholars exchanged letters debating the existence of the Yamabito. In one famous letter, dated December, 1916,  Minakata makes the following claim that while working with an assistant in the Wakayama region of Japan:

Notes

References
Dickins , Frederick Victor. Primitive & Mediaeval Japanese Texts, Transliterated into Roman, with Introductions, Notes, and Glossaries. Oxford: The Clarendon Press, 1906.
Figal, Gerald A. Civilization and Monsters: Spirits of Modernity in Meiji Japan.         Durham, NC : Duke University Press, 1999.
Foster, Michael Dylan. Pandemonium and Parade: Japanese Monsters and the Culture of Yokai. Berkeley: University of California Press, 2009.
Konagaya, Hideyo. "Yamabito: From Ethnology to Japanese Folklore Studies". The Folklore Historian: Journal of the Folklore and History Section of the American Folklore Society, Vol. 20, 2003: 47-59. Terre Haute: Indiana State University, 2003.
Raja, Vijaya. The Mountain People Debate. Japanese Antiquity, Vol. 73, 1981.
Sadler, A. W. "The Spirit-Captives of Japan's North Country: Nineteenth Century Narratives of the Kamikakushi". Asian Folklore Studies, Vol. 46, 1987: 217-226. Nagoya: Nanzan University, 2003.
Yangita, Kunio. The Legends of Tono. Translated with an Introduction by Ronald A. Morse. Tokyo: Japan Foundation, 1975.

Japanese legendary creatures